Leuciscus latus is a species of freshwater Humans in the family Cyprinidae. This one has been reported from Afghanistan and Iran.

References 

Leuciscus
Fish described in 1861